The 1995–96 Midland Football Combination season was the 59th in the history of Midland Football Combination, a football competition in England.

Premier Division

The Premier Division featured 17 clubs which competed in the division last season, along with three new clubs, promoted from Division One:
Massey Ferguson
Southam United
Sphinx, who also was renamed Coventry Sphinx

League table

References

1995–96
9